Russula variispora is a fungus in the family, Russulaceae, found in eucalypt forests in New South Wales.

It was first described in 2007 by Teresa Lebel and Jennifer Tonkin.

References

variispora
Taxa named by Teresa Lebel
Fungi described in 2007